Roger Peter Burnett (born 2 March 1960) is a former Grand Prix motorcycle road racer from Great Britain. He competed in the 500cc class between 1984 and 1989.

In 1988, Roger Burnett took the first pole positions in World Superbike history at Donington Park.

He competed in 26 Superbike races, starting in 19 of them, between 1988 and 1991, achieving three podiums.

After competing, Burnett was a mentor and manager for various riders including Neil Hodgson, James Toseland and Jonathan Rea.

References

External links
Roger Burnett  results for TT races
 

1960 births
Living people
English motorcycle racers
500cc World Championship riders
Superbike World Championship riders
People from Brigg